The Ribera del Duero is a comarca or district located at the southern tip of the province of Burgos, part of the Spanish autonomous community of Castile and León. The capital of the Ribera del Duero comarca or district is the town of Aranda de Duero.

The Ribera del Duero comarca slightly overlaps the Ribera del Duero D.O. wine region but only in the province of Burgos. The Ribera del Duero D.O. wine region stretches about 115km along "the banks of the river Duero" touching the provinces of Soria, Burgos, Segovia and Valladolid. It is bounded on the north by Arlanza comarca, south by the Province of Segovia, on the east by the province of Valladolid and on the west by the Sierra de la Demanda comarca and the province of Soria.

There are about 68 towns and villages (mostly villages) in the Ribera del Duero comarca.

History 
Ribera del Duero was repopulated mainly by Astur, Cantabri, Visigothic, ... origins and Mozarab after the border of Castile County and the kingdom of Cordoba reach the river Duero.

Geography 
The waters of the river Duero run from east to west all the shire.

Towns & Villages in the Ribera del Duero comarca/district

See also

Ribera del Duero wine region

External links
   Patroturisbur - Ribera del Duero  (in Spanish & English) 
 Hotels, Wineries, Towns, Restaurants and Activities of Ribera del Duero  (in Spanish & English) 
 Liceus - La Ribera del Duero (Burgos)  (in Spanish)
   Diario de la Ribera  (in Spanish) 
  El Soportal  (in Spanish)
   Nuestros pueblos (in Spanish)
 Website of the Province of Burgos delegation

Comarcas of the Province of Burgos